American country music singer Faith Hill has released seven studio albums, four compilation albums, and 46 singles. All of Hill's studio albums have been certified Gold or higher by the Recording Industry Association of America.

After working as a secretary in a Nashville music publishing firm, Hill recorded a demo tape and was signed to Warner Bros. Records. She released her debut album in late-1993 titled, Take Me as I Am. The album sold three million copies in the United States and was certified "multi-platinum" in sales. With Hill's first albums, she was largely marketed as a country artist and her singles found major success on country radio. The lead single, "Wild One" spent four weeks at number one on the Billboard Hot Country Songs chart that year, making Hill the first female country artist in 30 years spend a series of weeks at the top spot with a debut single. The album's additional singles, "Piece of My Heart" (a cover of the Erma Franklin song) and "Take Me as I Am" were also significant country hits. In 1995 released her second studio album, It Matters to Me. which also reached multi-platinum status. Its title track was a number one country hit, and the other singles released including "Let's Go to Vegas" and "Someone Else's Dream" were Top 10 hits. After meeting country music artist, Tim McGraw, the two eventually married in October 1996. For three years, Hill did not release any albums after giving birth to her first child. However she did collaborate with McGraw on his single, "It's Your Love", which was a number one country hit in 1997.

Hill returned with her third studio album in 1998 titled, Faith. The album's first single, "This Kiss" was promoted as a country and pop single, and therefore it not only peaked at number one on the Billboard Hot Country Songs chart, but also charted in the Top 10 on the Billboard Hot 100, peaking at number seven. The album's other singles remained successful on the country charts, peaking within the Top 10, including a duet with McGraw, "Just to Hear You Say That You Love Me". Immediately after tour from her previous album, she returned to the studio to record her fourth album, Breathe. The album was marketed as a crossover Pop music album, which would bring Hill major success in pop and adult contemporary music. Breathe sold eight million copies in the United States, certifying 8× Platinum in sales. The title track was the album's first single, where it became Hill's biggest hit to date, spending six weeks at number one on the Billboard Hot Country Songs, while also peaking at number two on the Hot 100, becoming the biggest hit of the year according to Billboard. Its follow-up, "The Way You Love Me" was also a number one hit, and reached the Top 10 on the Hot 100 as well.

In 2002, she released another pop-oriented album, Cry. Although it sold two million copies in the United States, its singles proved not to be as successful as planned. The title track only reached number 12 on the country charts and number 33 on the Hot 100. The additional three singles released ("When the Lights Go Down", "One", and "You're Still Here") were even less successful than the title track. Hill stayed on a three-year hiatus before releasing her next album, Fireflies in 2005. The album returned Hill to traditional country music, and the lead single, "Mississippi Girl" (written by John Rich) became Hill's first number one hit on the Billboard Hot Country Songs chart in five years. In addition, Fireflies sold two million copies in the United States and was certified 2× Platinum in sales. In 2007, Hill released her first greatest hits compilation, The Hits, followed by a Christmas studio album in late 2008, Joy to the World. A duets album with Tim McGraw, The Rest of Our Life, was released in 2017.

Studio albums

Compilation albums

Singles

1990s

2000s

2010s

As a featured artist

Other charted songs

Videography

Video albums

Music videos

Guest appearances

Notes

References

Discography
Country music discographies
Discographies of American artists